Reggie Keely (born June 9, 1991) is an American professional basketball player who plays for Þór Akureyri of the Úrvalsdeild karla. He played collegiately for the Ohio Bobcats.

College career
Keely played four seasons for Ohio University, the team he committed to in 2008. In his time with the Bobcats, he scored a total 1,131 points for the team. This made him the fifth all-time scorer for Ohio. Keely is also the seventh all-time blocker for the Bobcats with a total of 107 blocks.

Honours
MAC All-Tournament Team (2013)
All-MAC Third Team (2013)

Statistics

Professional career
Keely's professional career started in 2013, when he signed with the Den Helder Kings in the Netherlands. After 10 games Keely was waived by the Kings.

For the 2014–15 season he signed with BC Apollo Amsterdam. After 2 games he signed with the Hungarian team Sopron KC. After a short try-out he returned to Apollo.

On February 18, 2015, he signed with MZT Skopje of the Macedonian First League.

On December 28, 2017, Keely joined Faros Larissas of the Greek Basket League.

On August 24, 2018, Keely signed a one-year deal with Czech club BC Brno.

In November 2021, Keely signed with Þór Akureyri of the Úrvalsdeild karla.

References

External links
Dutch Basketball League profile and statistics 
Ohio Bobcats bio
https://m.instagram.com/reggiekeely1?igshid=1derb7nd6rw54

1991 births
Living people
American expatriate basketball people in the Czech Republic
American expatriate basketball people in Finland
American expatriate basketball people in Greece
American expatriate basketball people in the Netherlands
American expatriate basketball people in North Macedonia
American expatriate basketball people in Romania
American expatriate basketball people in Slovakia
American expatriate basketball people in Slovenia
American men's basketball players
Apollo Amsterdam players
Basketball players from Ohio
BC Brno players
Cleveland Heights High School alumni
Den Helder Kings players
Dutch Basketball League players
Gymnastikos S. Larissas B.C. players
KK MZT Skopje players
Kobrat players
Ohio Bobcats men's basketball players
People from University Heights, Ohio
Power forwards (basketball)
Sportspeople from Cuyahoga County, Ohio
Úrvalsdeild karla (basketball) players
Þór Akureyri men's basketball players
Helios Suns players